Odontotaenius is a genus of bess beetles in the family Passalidae. There are about 11 described species in Odontotaenius.

Species
These 11 species belong to the genus Odontotaenius:
 Odontotaenius brevioripennis (Kuwert, 1891)
 Odontotaenius calimaensis Pardo-Locarno, 2012
 Odontotaenius cerastes Castillo, Rivera-Cervantes & Reyes-Castillo, 1988
 Odontotaenius cuspidatus (Truqui, 1857)
 Odontotaenius disjunctus (Illiger, 1800) (horned passalus)
 Odontotaenius elenae Pardo-Locarno, 2012
 Odontotaenius floridanus Schuster, 1994
 Odontotaenius haberi Kuwert, 1897
 Odontotaenius striatopunctatus (Percheron, 1835)
 Odontotaenius striatulus (Dibb, 1940)
 Odontotaenius zodiacus (Truqui, 1857)

References

Further reading

External links

 

Passalidae